Psilocybe germanica is an invalidly described (Art. F.5.1. of the Code) species of psychedelic mushroom in the family Hymenogastraceae. It was described as a new species in 2015 by Jochen Gartz and Georg Wiedemann.   DNA sequencing of the  balls of P. germanica has found that it is a synonym of P. serbica.

Description
They are a deep brown color when moist, but become whitish when dry. The gills are initially brownish before becoming purplish-brown when the spores mature. It is initially stuffed with mycelia but later hollows. The wood substrate under the mushroom is held together by rhizomorphs at the base of the stipe. The cap and stipe bruise blue when touched, while the umbo typically becomes gray-bluish on its own. Frosts or rains often cause an intense bluing reaction.

Spores measure 9–12 by 5.5–7.5 μm, and have a germ pore. Cheilocystidia (cystidia on the gill edges) are lageniform (flask-shaped), measuring 25–33 by 6.0–8.3 μm; pleurocystidia (cystidia on the gill faces) are absent from the hymenium.

Habitat and distribution
A saprobic species, Psilocybe germanica grows on wood chips, or bark chips mixed with soil. Found in parks, fruiting occurs from September to December. It is known only from Germany.

See also
List of Psilocybe species
List of Psilocybin mushrooms
Psilocybe germanica ITS holotype sequence
Psilocybe germanica LSU holotype sequence

References

Entheogens
Psychoactive fungi
germanica
Psychedelic tryptamine carriers
Fungi described in 2015
Fungi of Europe